MYB may refer to:
 MYB (gene), a human gene
 Myb, a plant transcription factor family 
 Marylebone station, London, by National Rail station code
 Mbay language, by ISO 639-3 code
 MyB, South Korean girl group